Verxina, (born on March 5, 2009) is a retired race horse sired by Deep Impact, and out of . She is owned by a former professional baseball player, Kazuhiro Sasaki.

Life
Verxina, a black mare was foaled on March 5, 2009, by Deep Impact, and out of Halwa Sweet, and was bred by Northern Racing in Japan. Verxina's dam, Halwa Sweet, went on to give birth to two other successful racehorses, Cheval Grand and Vivlos; both of which are also owned by Sasaki.

She began her racing career when she was a 2-year-old, but debuted as a 3-year-old. Her major wins were at the Queen Cup, and twice at the Victoria Mile. During her time as a race horse, Verxina represented the stables she resided in, Yasuo Tomomichi, twice. Verxina was retired as at the age of 5 to become a breeding mare at Northern Racing in Abira, Hokkaido.

Career
Verxina was ridden by Hiroyuki Uchida for most of her races. She debuted as a 3-year-old, at the Daily Hai Queen Cup.

3 years old
At the age of 3, Verxina won the Daily Hai Queen Cup in Japan. She also placed second at the Yushun Himba, Oka Sho, Shuka Sho, Queen Elizabeth II Commemorative Cup, and Kansai Telecasting Corporation Sho Rose Stakes.

4-5 years old
Verxina won the Victoria Mile twice, once as a 4-year-old, and the other time a year later. During those years, she was the most favored both times. Both the Tokyo Shimbun Hai and the Hanshin Himba Stakes had a major defeat with 11 landings, and although Victoria Mile was welcomed as the 11th most popular despite being the champion of the previous year, in the race she achieved her consecutive title. After the Victoria Mile she went to Takarazuka Kinen. The victory itself of the front run limited to the mare was flocked as it was seen, and also the rating was low as 8th most popular. However, in the race that Yuichi Fukunaga switched to, she ran away in the same way as before, dropping to a super slow pace of 1000 minutes passing 62 seconds. Although it was replaced by the Gold Ship and Karen Milotick at the last line, Verxina showed a good fight entering 3rd.

In autumn Verxina went to the Queen Elizabeth II Cup and Arima Kinen, but lost both races before retiring from racing.

References 

2009 racehorse births
Racehorses bred in Japan
Racehorses trained in Japan
Thoroughbred family 12-c